The Nottingham Open was originally known as the Nottingham Championships or Nottingham Lawn Tennis Tournament (1887–1967), is a tennis tournament for men and women held in Nottingham, United Kingdom, played on outdoor grass courts at the Nottingham Tennis Centre. After being discontinued in 2008, it was downgraded in 2011 to ATP Challenger Tour and ITF Women's Circuit. briefly re-established as an ATP World Tour 250 event on the men's tour in 2015 and 2016, before returning to a Challenger event in 2017, and since 2015 it has been an international event on the women's tour. The tournament is held in June as a "warm-up" for Wimbledon.

History 
The event was founded in 1887 as the Nottingham Championships until 1967. At the start of the open era in 1968 it became part of the independent International Tennis Federation annual tour until 1973. In 1971 it was previously known as  John Player Nottingham Tennis Tournament, John Player Open, Samsung Open, Aegon Open Nottingham and Nature Valley Open among other names. Originally a replacement of the Manchester Open and was part of the Grand Prix tennis circuit from (1973–77), it was also a Grand Prix Super Series prestigious event (1974–75), which was discontinued after the 2008 edition, and the International Women's Open at Eastbourne became a combined event for both male and female players.

Nottingham City Council bosses announced their "extreme disappointment" at having Nottingham Open removed from the ATP Tour. The event had, according to the council, been partly responsible for stimulating interest in tennis in Nottingham. Roger Draper, the head of the Lawn Tennis Association (LTA) responded by saying that the changes would introduce tennis to a "new audience". It was announced later in 2008 that Nottingham would host a new tennis event, the Aegon Nottingham Trophy, in lieu of the Surbiton Trophy, which was cancelled, in 2009. The new event was an ATP Challenger Series event, one level lower than the main ATP Tour. The Nottingham Tennis Centre, which had hosted the Open, had undergone refurbishments costing £735,000 in 2008, and councillor Dave Trimble called it "great news" to have a new tennis event in the city.

In 2015 Birmingham based company Eventmasters LTD were appointed by the LTA to promote official hospitality at both the WTA ATP Open events transforming part of the indoor court area into the Sherwood Suite.

Past finals

Men's singles

Men's doubles

Women's singles

Women's doubles

Source: LTA

Notes

References

External links
  Nature Valley International – ATP tournament profile
  Nature Valley Open – WTA tournament profile
  
 Nature Valley Open – LTA tournament profile
 Official website
 Men's ITF search
 Women's ITF search

 
Grass court tennis tournaments
ATP Tour
WTA Tour
ATP Challenger Tour
 
ITF Women's World Tennis Tour
Sport in Nottingham
Tennis tournaments in England
Recurring sporting events established in 1970
Recurring events disestablished in 2008
Recurring sporting events established in 2011
1970 establishments in England
2008 disestablishments in England
2015 establishments in England